During the 1998–99 English football season, Oxford United F.C. competed in the Football League First Division.

Season summary
During October 1998, the backroom staff at Oxford United were unpaid due to the club's financial situation with the new stadium; the threat of administration caused a group of fans to set up a pressure group called Fighting for Oxford United's Life (FOUL). The group began to publicise the club's plight through a series of meetings and events, including a 'Scarf of Unity', which was a collection of scarfs from various clubs which was long enough to stretch around the perimeter of the pitch. Chairman Robin Herd stepped down to concentrate on his engineering projects, and in April 1999 Firoz Kassam bought Herd's 89.9% controlling interest in Oxford United for £1, with which he also inherited the club's estimated £15 million debt. Kassam reduced the £9 million of the debt to just £900,000, by virtue of a Company Voluntary Arrangement, by which unsecured creditors who were owed over £1,000 were reimbursed with 10p for every pound they were owed. Secured creditors were paid off when Kassam sold the Manor to another of his companies, for £6 million. Kassam set about completing the unfinished stadium, gaining planning permission for a bowling alley, a multiplex cinema, and a hotel to sit next to the stadium, following a series of legal battles which were eventually all settled. The season ended with relegation back to the Second Division.

Final league table

Results
Oxford United's score comes first

Legend

Football League First Division

FA Cup

League Cup

Squad

Left club during the season

References

Oxford United F.C. seasons
Oxford United